Alexander McGregor Hamilton (21 November 1937 – 3 November 2009) was a Scottish footballer who played as a wing half. He played for Accrington Stanley and York City in the English Football League.

Career
Born in Kirkcolm, Wigtownshire, Hamilton played for Drumore Juniors before joining Accrington Stanley in August 1957. After making 82 appearances in the English Football League he joined York City in March 1962. He finished the 1961–62 season with 11 appearances for York and he left the club to sign for Nelson in August. He later played for Clayton of the West Lancashire Football League and Poplar of the Accrington and District Combination. He died at Royal Blackburn Hospital, Blackburn, Lancashire on 3 November 2009 at the age of 71.

References

1937 births
2009 deaths
Scottish footballers
Association football midfielders
Accrington Stanley F.C. (1891) players
York City F.C. players
Nelson F.C. players
English Football League players